Tara Spencer-Nairn (born January 6, 1978) is a Canadian actress best known for her work on the television series Corner Gas.

Early life
Spencer-Nairn was born on January 6, 1978 in Montreal, Quebec, but raised in Vancouver, British Columbia. She is a graduate of the Vancouver Film School.

Career
Spencer-Nairn has appeared in a number of film and TV productions since the mid-1990s. Some of her most notable film appearances include New Waterford Girl, Wishmaster: The Prophecy Fulfilled, and television guest appearances on Puppets Who Kill, Relic Hunter, Cold Squad, Bliss, Flashpoint, and The Outer Limits. In 2005, she portrayed Wayne Gretzky's sister Kim Gretzky in the movie Waking Up Wally: The Walter Gretzky Story.

Her most notable roles are Dog River Police Department (DRPD) Constable Karen Pelly on Corner Gas and Sandy Wardwell on CTV's The Listener.  Concurrent to appearing in Corner Gas, she also appeared on the science fiction series ReGenesis.

Personal life
Spencer-Nairn married Josh Glover in 2008. Together, they have sons Foster (born 2011) and Carson (born 2014).

Spencer-Nairn is the younger daughter and youngest of the three children of John Chaloner Spencer-Nairn, the Old Etonian second son of Scottish politician Douglas Spencer-Nairn of the Spencer-Nairn baronets, and his second wife Lucie (née Belanger).

Filmography

Film

Television

References

External links

1978 births
Living people
Canadian people of Scottish descent
Actresses from Montreal
Anglophone Quebec people
Canadian film actresses
Canadian television actresses
Canadian voice actresses